Juniors Fashion Week (JFW) is a bi-annual runway showcase being conducted in Mumbai, Kolkata, Chennai and NCR, Bangalore, Chandigarh, Pune India. JFW educate the children about the latest fashion trends. JFW also showcases various National and International Brands on the runway and display brand windows to the public audience.

Selection process at JFW 
Junior's Fashion Week does not conduct audition, because it believes that every child must have the knowledge about the right fashion and trends. JFW conducts various workshop to educate the participating children and help them to boost their confidence and self-esteem to face the audience. JFW also conducts various non-profit activities to promote the government policies like 'Beti Bachaao - Beti Padhaao' from Government of India.

Selection criteria for participation 
The children between the age of 4 to 14 can participate in Junior's Fashion Week. JFW has a limited number of the seats reserved for physical challenged children or 'Divyang'. Junior's Fashion Week accepts the entries from across the world for both male and female children.

Showcase gallery

See also 
Armani, Fashion Week, London Fashion Week, List of fashion events, Runway (fashion)

References 

Junior's Fashion Week
Fashion weeks